George Frederick Buckland (13 April 1883 – 28 January 1937) was a British lacrosse player who competed in the 1908 Summer Olympics. He was part of the British team which won the silver medal.

References

External links

1883 births
1937 deaths
Lacrosse players at the 1908 Summer Olympics
Olympic lacrosse players of Great Britain
Olympic silver medallists for Great Britain
Medalists at the 1908 Summer Olympics
Olympic medalists in lacrosse
20th-century British people